Goera is a genus of caddisflies in the family Goeridae. There are at least 120 described species in Goera.

The type species for Goera is Phryganea pilosa J.C. Fabricius.

See also
 List of Goera species

References

Further reading

 
 
 
 

Trichoptera genera
Integripalpia